Puente Genil-Herrera railway station is a railway station serving the Spanish towns of Puente Genil, Córdoba and Herrera, Seville in  Andalusia. It is served by the Spanish AVE high-speed rail system, on the Madrid–Málaga high-speed rail line.

History
The station was built in 2006 at a cost of €7.2 million. It has been since one of the least-used stations on the entire high-speed network, with 69 passengers a day in 2016.

References

Railway stations in Andalusia
Railway stations in Spain opened in 2006
Buildings and structures in the Province of Córdoba (Spain)